This is a list of the Mayors of Willoughby City Council and its predecessors, a local government area of New South Wales, Australia. The official title of Mayors while holding office is: His/Her Worship The Mayor of Willoughby. First incorporated on 23 October 1865 as the Municipality of Willoughby, the council first met to elect six Aldermen and two Auditors on 16 December 1865, in the house of James Harris French and the first Chairman, James William Bligh, was elected on 1 January 1866. With the enactment of the Municipalities Act, 1867 the title of Chairman was changed to "Mayor".

The council area was proclaimed as the City of Willoughby on 17 November 1989. On 1 July 1993 following the enactment of a new Local Government Act, elected representatives of the council were to be known as 'Councillor', replacing the former title of 'Alderman'. Originally, nominated annually by the council, since 1999 the mayor has been popularly elected for a four-year term.

List of incumbents

Notes and references

External links
 City of Willoughby (Council website)

Willoughby
Mayors
Mayors Willoughby